Tercera División may refer to:

 Tercera División, the fourth level of the Spanish football league system
 Tercera División de México, the fourth tier in Mexico's football league system